Silent Recoil: Dub System One is the fourth solo album by American composer Bill Laswell. It was released on September 27, 1995 by Low.

Track listing

Personnel 
Adapted from the Silent Recoil: Dub System One liner notes.

Bill Laswell – bass guitar, drum programming, effects, producer
Edgard Moscatelli – cover art
Robert Musso – engineering

Release history

References

External links 
 
 Silent Recoil: Dub System One at Bandcamp

1995 albums
Bill Laswell albums
Albums produced by Bill Laswell